"Rain Down Love" is a song by English dance band Freemasons. It was released as the third single from their second studio album Unmixed and features vocals from the American singer-songwriter Siedah Garrett. The music video for this song is almost identical to Daft Punk single "Around the World".

Track listing

Other Version
 "Rain Down Love" 2014 (Extended) [feat. Siedah Garrett] - 7:58

Charts

References

2007 singles
Freemasons (band) songs
Songs written by Siedah Garrett
2007 songs
London Records singles